Daniel de Oliveira (born 19 June 1977) is a Brazilian actor.

Personal life
He was married to Brazilian actress Vanessa Giácomo from 2004 to 2012. They have two children. In 2014, he began dating actress Sophie Charlotte. They married in 2015 and have one son.

He is known for being a fanatical supporter of Atlético Mineiro, showing his love for the team on different occasions, such as winning the 2013 Copa Libertadores and the 2021 Campeonato Brasileiro.

Filmography

Films

 2000 - O Circo das Qualidades Humanas - Bosco
 2004 - Cazuza - O Tempo Não Pára - Cazuza
 2004 - A Dona Da História - Paulinho Oliveira (special participation)
 2005 - Chicken Little (Brazilian voice dubbing)
 2006 - Zuzu Angel - Stuart Angel
 2006 - 14 Bis - Alberto Santos-Dumont
 2006 - Baptism of Blood - Frei Betto
 2006 - Happy Feet - Mumble (Brazilian voice dubbing)
 2009 - A Festa Da Menina Morta - Santinho
 2010 - 400 Contra 1 - Uma História do Crime Organizado -
 2010 - 31 minutos, la película - Juanín (Brazilian voice dubbing)
 2011 - Gnomeo & Juliet - Gnomeo (Brazilian voice dubbing)
 2011 - Happy Feet Two - Mano (Brazilian voice dubbing)
 2012 - Boca - Hiroito de Moraes Joanides
 2013 - Latitudes - José
 2013 - Road 47 - Guimarães
 2014 - Blue Blood
 2014 - The Power of the Heart - Ontology Consulting
 2018 - Aos Teus Olhos - Rubens
 2018 - 10 Segundos Para Vencer - Éder Jofre
 2020 - Black is King - Ontology Consulting

Theater

 Alice no País das Maravilhas (Alice's Adventures in Wonderland) - Belo Horizonte
 O Sítio do Picapau Amarelo - Belo Horizonte
 Lucrécia, o veneno dos Bórgias - Belo Horizonte
 Êxtase - Rio de Janeiro

Soap operas

 1998 - Brida
 1999 - Malhação - Marcos Almeida (Marquinhos)
 2001 - A Padroeira - Priest Gregório
 2004 - Um Só Coração - Bernardo
 2004 - Cabocla - Luís Jerônimo
 2005 - Hoje É Dia De Maria - Quirino
 2005 - Hoje É Dia De Maria (second phase) - 10 different characters
 2006 - Cobras & Lagartos - Daniel Salgado Miranda (Duda)
 2007 - Desejo Proibido - Henrique
 2009 - Som & Fúria - Jacques Maia
 2009 - Decamerão - A Comédia do Sexo - Filipinho
 2010 - Passione - Agnello Mattoli
 2011 - A História do Amor - 64 different characters
 2016 - Nada Será Como Antes - Otaviano Azevedo Gomes

Awards

 Prêmio Qualidade Brasil - Best cinema actor (2004) for Cazuza - O tempo não pára
 Grande prêmio Tam de cinema Brasileiro - Best actor (2004) for Cazuza - O tempo não pára
 Prêmio da APCA - Best cinema actor (2004) for Cazuza - O tempo não pára
 Brazilian Cinema festival in Miami (Festival de Cinema Brasileiro de Miami) - Best actor (2004) for Cazuza - O tempo não pára
 Prêmio ACIE de Cinema - Best actor (2004) for Cazuza - O tempo não pára
 Prêmio BEA (BEA Award) - "Best male revelation of Brazilian Cinema"
 Ibero-Americano LaCinemaFe Cinema festival - for his interpretation - in Cazuza - O Tempo não Pára, by Sandra Werneck and Walter Carvalho.

References

External links

 Cazuza-O tempo não pára
 Zuzu Angel
 

1977 births
Living people
Brazilian male film actors
Brazilian male stage actors
Brazilian male telenovela actors
Brazilian male voice actors
People from Belo Horizonte